Gender-related violence or gender-based violence includes any kind of violence directed against people due to their gender or gender identification.

Types of gender-related violence include:
 Violence against women (sometimes referred to simply as "gender violence")
 Violence against men
 Violence against LGBT people
 Trans bashing, violence against trans and non-binary people
 Gay bashing, which may be related to gender expression
Online gender-based violence, violence against any of the above groups (although disproportionately women) that takes place online

See also 
Gender and violence
Sexual harassment
Sexual violence
Category:Gender-related violence